Roela Radiniyavuni (born 7 April 1990) is a Fijian rugby league and rugby union footballer who played for the New Zealand Warriors in the NRL Women's Premiership. 

Primarily a er, Radiniyavuni has represented Fiji in rugby league, rugby union and rugby sevens.

Biography
Born in Suva, Radiniyavuni represented Fiji in rugby union and rugby sevens before switching to rugby league in 2019.

Rugby league career 
In 2019, Radiniyavuni relocated to Auckland, New Zealand and began playing rugby league for the Richmond Roses.

In July 2019, she represented the Akarana Falcons at the NZRL Women's National Tournament. On 10 July 2019, Radiniyavuni joined the New Zealand Warriors NRL Women's Premiership team.

In Round 2 of the 2019 NRL Women's season, Radiniyavuni made her debut for the Warriors in a 6–26 loss to the St George Illawarra Dragons.

Rugby union career 
In November 2019, Radiniyavuni returned to rugby sevens, rejoining the Fijian national team. She competed at the 2020 Summer Olympics. She won a bronze medal at the event.

Radiniyavuni was named in the Fijiana Drua squad for the 2022 Super W season.

In 2022, Radiniyavuni was named in the Fijiana squad for two test matches against Australia and Japan. She started in the game against Japan and scored a try in the 29th minute. She also started in the test against Australia.

Radiniyavuni was named on the bench in the warm up match against Canada ahead of the World Cup. She was selected for the Fijiana squad to the 2021 Rugby World Cup in New Zealand.

References

External links

NRL profile

1990 births
Living people
Fijian female rugby union players
Fijian female rugby league players
Fiji women's national rugby league team players
Rugby league wingers
Rugby union wings
New Zealand Warriors (NRLW) players
Sportspeople from Suva
Olympic rugby sevens players of Fiji
Rugby sevens players at the 2020 Summer Olympics
Medalists at the 2020 Summer Olympics
Olympic bronze medalists for Fiji
Olympic medalists in rugby sevens
Fiji international women's rugby sevens players
Fiji women's international rugby union players